Maralan is a historic district in the southeastern part of Tabriz, the biggest city in Iranian Azerbaijan. To the north lies the Khiyavan district, and to the west, Maralan shares an order with the Nobar district. The Azadi Blvd. divides Maralan district into a northern and southern part.

References

External links 
 Virtual Museum of Historical Buildings of Tabriz (School of Architecture, Tabriz Islamic Art University).
 Iranian Student's Tourism & Traveling Agency, ISTTA. (English), (Persian)

Districts of Tabriz